Scymnus (Pullus) quadrillum, is a species of lady beetle found in India, Bangladesh, Sri Lanka, Thailand, Taiwan, Nepal, Vietnam, Laos, China, and Pakistan.

Description
The total length of an adult scymnus quadrillum is about 1.6 to 2.0 mm. 
The body appears glabrous and clothed with dense pubescence. The head is brownish black and the eyes are comparably large. The pronotum and the elytra are dark to blue and shiny. 
The scutellum is black. There are two reddish spots found on each elytron, and the ventrum is brownish black. The abdominal postcoxal process is bifurcated and the postcoxal line is complete.

Biology
It is a predator of wide range of whiteflies, mealybugs and aphids including: Aphis gossypii, Paracoccus marginatus and Pentalonia nigronervosa.

References

Coccinellidae
Insects of Sri Lanka
Beetles described in 1858